Eric Oldfield is an Australian actor, musician and former model, who remains best known for his role in the soap opera The Young Doctors as Dr. Ben Fielding.

TV credits include: The Godfathers, Airhawk, Chopper Squad, The Bluestone Boys, Waterloo Station, Possession, Paradise Beach, Water Rats and Murder Call.

Filmography

References

External links
 

Australian male television actors
Living people
1948 births
Fellows of the American Physical Society